This article lists the 100 oldest living current or former state leaders whose age can be demonstrated beyond reasonable doubt. State leaders are defined to include heads of state (including representatives who act in their stead, generally a governor-general), heads of government and internationally recognized de facto leaders of sovereign states with significant international recognition. Leaders are not included if no reliable secondary sources have confirmed that the leader is alive within the last 10 years. Leaders currently in office are in bold in green, with Paul Biya of Cameroon being the oldest currently serving head of state.

Gallery

List

Addendum

Uncertain date of birth

Unclear status as state leaders

Unclear status as state leaders with an uncertain date of birth

See also

 List of centenarians (politicians and civil servants)
 List of current heads of state and government
 List of current state leaders by date of assumption of office
 List of elected and appointed female heads of state and government
 List of longest-reigning monarchs
 List of youngest state leaders since 1900
 Lists of state leaders by age
 Lists of state leaders
 Records of heads of state

Notes

References

External links
United Nations—a list of heads of state, heads of government, and foreign ministers
WorldStatesmen—an online encyclopedia of the leaders of nations and territories

oldest living state leaders
living state leaders
Oldest living